Suriname competed at the 2014 Summer Youth Olympics, in Nanjing, China that transpired between 16 August and 28 August 2014.

Medalists

Athletics

Suriname qualified two athletes.

Qualification Legend: Q=Final A (medal); qB=Final B (non-medal); qC=Final C (non-medal); qD=Final D (non-medal); qE=Final E (non-medal)

Boys
Field Events

Badminton

Suriname was given a quota to compete by the tripartite committee.

Singles

Doubles

Swimming

Suriname qualified two swimmers.

Boys

Girls

Taekwondo

Suriname was given a wild card to compete.

Boys

References

Summer Youth Olympics
Nations at the 2014 Summer Youth Olympics
Suriname at the Youth Olympics